Hostice (local dialect: Hostyze)  is a village in Šumperk District, Olomouc Region, Czech Republic. The village is administered by Ruda nad Moravou council. In 2001, the number of inhabitants was 450. The area is served by one bus line.

History
In 1397, Hostice was considered to be two separated villages - Velká Hostyz (literally Great Hostyz) and Malá Hostyz (literally Little Hostyz). Malá Hostyz is referred as deserted in a note from 1489. Malá Hostyz was probably in place of nowadays Pustá hamlet. 
Hostice was for all of its history part of Ruda nad Moravou manor. During the 1870s, button manufactory was established. Brushes producing was started in 1918 operating to 1991. Hostice farmers resisted to the collectivization up to 1957.

Notable natives
 Anežka Šulová (1877-1954), writer

References

Villages in Šumperk District
Neighbourhoods in the Czech Republic